Ethel Rolt Wheeler (pen name, Rolt Wheeler; 12 July 1869, Lewisham, London – October 1958, Glasgow) was an English poet, author and journalist.

Biography
Ethel Rolt Wheeler was born Mary Ethel Wheeler, the daughter of the stone merchant Joseph Wheeler, and Amina Cooke Taylor, both of whom were of Irish descent. She wrote using the pen name "Rolt Wheeler", as did her brother, the author and occultist Francis Rolt Wheeler. She was the granddaughter of the Cork shipbuilder Joseph Wheeler on her paternal side and author and anti-Corn law propagandist, William Cooke Taylor on her maternal side.

In the 1890s, she became a committee member of the Irish Literary Society of London and chair of the Irish Circle of the Lyceum Club.

She was a prolific author and contributed to many journals including Dome, The Theosophical Review, East and West, The Atlantic Monthly, The London Magazine, Irish Book Lover, Harper's Magazine, The Butterfly, The Anglo-Saxon Review and Great Thought as well as working for and contributing work to The Academy. She also wrote in support of the suffragette movement in articles such as Fair Ladies in Revolt in The Englishwoman's Review

In 1915, she is recorded as living at 59, Stradella Road, Herne Hill.

Selected works 

 Wheeler, Ethel (1903). Verses, R. Brimley Johnson; 
 Wheeler, Ethel (1905). The Year’s Horoscope, sonnets, The Brochure Series
 Rolt-Wheeler, Ethel (1906). Behind the Veil, Tales, David Nutt, London
 Rolt-Wheeler, Ethel (1910). Famous Blue-Stockings, Methuen, London
 Rolt-Wheeler, Ethel (1913). Ireland’s Veils, and other poems, Elkin Mathews, London
 Rolt-Wheeler, Ethel (1913). Women of the Cell and Cloister, Methuen, London 
 Gawsworth, John (ed.) (1937). Richards’ Shilling Selections from Modern Poets: Ethel Rolt-Wheeler, London

References

External links
 Letters to Ethel Rolt Wheeler, 1901–1938
 Alice Meynell letters to Ethel Rolt Wheeler, 1910-1911

1869 births
1958 deaths
People from Lewisham
Irish women poets
Irish women short story writers
20th-century Irish women writers
20th-century Irish short story writers
Pseudonymous women writers
20th-century pseudonymous writers